Onomichi FM (JOZZ8AF-FM 79.4 MHz) is a Japanese community FM radio station in Onomichi, Hiroshima Prefecture, Japan.

The station was founded on April 19, 1999 and went on the air on June 1, 1999.

External links
Onomichi FM

Mass media in Onomichi, Hiroshima
Radio stations in Japan
Companies based in Hiroshima Prefecture
Radio stations established in 1999
1999 establishments in Japan